Hamaker may refer to:

Hugo Christiaan Hamaker, Dutch scientist responsible for Hamaker theory
Hamaker constant, definition for a Van der Waals (VdW) body-body interaction
Hamaker Force Interactions, sum of the attractive or repulsive forces between molecules
John D. Hamaker, pioneer of soil remineralization
Hamaker theory, explains the van der Waals forces between objects larger than molecules

See also

Atlee Hammaker, former Major League Baseball left-handed pitcher 
Haymaker (disambiguation)
John Haymaker, founder of Franklin Township, Portage County, Ohio
John Wanamaker, United States merchant
Zoë Wanamaker, American-British actress
Wanamaker's, department store